Adatepe Dam is a dam in Kahramanmaraş Province, Turkey, built between 1993 and 2002. The dam creates a lake which is 18.60 km ² and irrigates 44,030 hectares.

See also
List of dams and reservoirs in Turkey

External links
DSI

Dams in Kahramanmaraş Province
Dams completed in 2002
2002 establishments in Turkey